The Kōkee Ditch is an irrigation canal on the island of Kauai.

In 1923, construction began on the Kōkee Ditch system to open the mauka hills to sugar cane production.

By 1926, the Kōkee Ditch was completed, diverting water from Mohihi Stream and the headwaters of the Waimea River in the Alakai Swamp at an altitude of about 3400 feet. About one-fourth of the Kōkee Ditch supply irrigated the highland sugar cane fields below Puu Ōpae reservoir on Niu Ridge, and the balance irrigated the highland fields east of Kōkee Road.

Canals in Hawaii
Geography of Kauai
Irrigation projects
Irrigation in the United States
Canals opened in 1926